Yasmine Nayar a Swiss - Algerian pop singer whose diverse vocal ability and style has attracted a following from different countries in the Arab world.
Nayar started her music career at a young age; in 2016 she released her first single Bechwech. She released her second single Eysh Eysh in the same year.

Discography

Singles
 Chkoun Gall ( 2018 )
 La Wela ( 2O17 )
 Eysh Eysh (Remix) (2017)
 Bechwech (2016)
 Eysh Eysh (2016)
 Enchanté song (2016)

Videography

References

External links 
 

1990 births
Living people
21st-century Algerian women singers